This is a list of all songs recorded by Steve Harley, including those under the name Cockney Rebel and Steve Harley & Cockney Rebel.

Songs

As a featured artist

Unreleased songs

Songs produced for other artists

References

Lists of songs recorded by British artists
British music-related lists